The dating and sequence of the Hittite kings is compiled from fragmentary records, supplemented by the recent find in Hattusa of a cache of more than 3500 seal impressions giving names and titles and genealogy of Hittite kings. All dates given here are approximate, relying on synchronisms with known chronologies for neighbouring countries and Egypt.

All reign lengths are approximate. The list uses the middle chronology, the most generally accepted chronology of the Ancient Near East and the chronology that accords best with Hittite evidence.

Old kingdom (c. 1650 – c. 1500 BC)

Middle kingdom (c. 1500 – c. 1420 BC)

New kingdom (c. 1420 – c. 1190 BC)

See also

List of Neo-Hittite kings, for the rulers of the Neo-Hittite states, some of whom were direct descendants of the Hittite kings
The rulers of Carchemish in particular presented themselves as successors of the Hittite kings and ruled in northern Syria until defeated by the Assyrians in 717 BC.
History of the Hittites
Tawananna, for Hittite queens

Notes

References

Hittite kings
Hittite kings, list of